Vayuputra is a 2009 Indian Kannada-language romantic action film directed by Kishore Sarja and produced by his brother, actor Arjun Sarja.  The Sarja brothers launched their nephew Chiranjeevi Sarja through this film in the lead role. The rest of the cast includes Ambareesh, Aindrita Ray, Ajay, Sadhu Kokila, Mukhyamantri Chandru, Ramesh Bhat, Padmaja Rao and Shobha Raghavendra.

The film is a remake of the Tamil film Sandakozhi directed by N. Linguswamy. The original score and soundtrack for the film is composed by V. Harikrishna. The film released on 3 September 2009. This was Kishore's final film as director; he died three months before the release.

Plot
Balu is an engineering student, who visits his classmate and friend Karthik's home in Mangalore after the final exams. He meets Karthik's sister Divya and they develop an affection which transforms into love. Punja is the local gangster in Mangalore who is feared by the entire town. On his way back to his hometown in Mandya, Balu sees Punja chasing a man with an sickle. When Punja was about to kill the man he was chasing, Balu interferes and stops Punja. An angered Punja immediately tries to attack Balu, Balu smashes Punja in front of everyone to save himself and leaves.

Punja is furious and wants vengeance against Balu. His men traps Karthik/Divya's father and learns about Balu's native place. Punja sets goons to kill Balu, but gets shocked when he learns that Balu's father is Chowde Gowda, a powerful chieftain of Mandya, and it will be difficult to attack them. Punja leaves to Mandya and waits for the right moment to kill Balu and his family. Balu meets Divya, Karthik and their family at a temple. Divya/Karthik's father is initially angered by seeing Balu as he was responsible to bring trouble by hitting Kasi, but Balu convinces him and both the families decide to get Balu and Divya married to each other.

One day, Punja tries to kill Balu, but instead attack Chowde Gowda. Chowde Gowda understands that Balu is being targeted and decides to protect him. A localite in Mandya hates Chowde Gowda and his family, and decides to help Punja kill Durai. Punja utilize the opportunity to kill Balu and Chowde Gowda, during a temple festival, but Balu saves Chowde Gowda and fights Kasi. Chowde Gowda asks Balu to fight with him and win. Balu thrashes Punja and leaves, challenging him to return if he still has guts to finish him.

Cast
 Chiranjeevi Sarja as Balu
 Aindrita Ray as Divya
 Ambareesh as Chowde Gowda, Balu's father
 Ajay as Punja
 Sadhu Kokila
 Mukhyamantri Chandru as Divya/Karthik's father
 Ramesh Bhat as a localite
 Padmaja Rao as Divya/Karthik's mother
 Shobha Raghavendra
 Arjun Sarja in a cameo appearance

Soundtrack
The music of the film was composed by V. Harikrishna and lyrics written by V. Nagendra Prasad and Kaviraj. The song "Ketta Kodukkura" from the original Tamil film was retained here as "Bhoomi Namma Jeeva". The song "Bhagavantha Bandha" was loosely inspired from Tamil song "Podhuvaaga En" from Murattu Kaalai (1980).

Reception

Critical response 
R G Vijayasarathy of Rediff.com scored the film at 2.5 out of 5 stars and says "The songs have been stylishly picturised and so are the first fight sequences. Except for the Baa Baare Gopamma song, Hari Krishna's music is uninspiring. Camera work is not exceptional, either. In a nutshell, Vaayuputhra is just a timepass movie which could have been better". A critic from The New Indian Express scored the film at 2.5 out of 5 stars and wrote "Chiranjeevi makes a grand debut and shows his talent in song and fight scenes. Rebel star Ambareesh's dialogue delivery is good. Aindrita is impressive. Hari Krishna's music is ordinary. Sundaranath Suvarna's camera work is above average".

References

External source

2009 films
2000s Kannada-language films
Indian action films
Kannada remakes of Tamil films
Films scored by V. Harikrishna
2000s masala films
2009 action films
Films directed by Kishore Sarja